Abudulahpur is a village in the Mirpur Tehsil of Mirpur District of Azad Kashmir, Pakistan.

Demography 

According to 1998 census of Pakistan, its population was 215.

History 

Like in many villages in the Mirpur region, many villages have immigrated to the United Kingdom. The Gakhar tribe makes up the bulk of the village population.

References 

Populated places in Mirpur District